Piz Grisch is a mountain of the Albula Alps, located west of Celerina in the canton of Graubünden.

References

External links
 Piz Grisch on Hikr

Mountains of the Alps
Alpine three-thousanders
Mountains of Graubünden
Mountains of Switzerland
Celerina/Schlarigna